The Kansas State University Carl R. Ice College of Engineering offers 12 undergraduate majors and one undecided program, as well as multiple minors, and graduate programs of study. The undergraduate engineering program is ranked among the top 100 engineering schools in the United States.

Programs 
 Multicultural Engineering Program
 Women in Engineering (WiE)

Facilities
The college is housed in six halls situated on the west side of the Kansas State University campus in Manhattan, Kansas. This includes the following structures:
 Durland-Rathbone-Fiedler-Engineering Hall
 Durland Hall - CHE
 Engineering Hall - CS, ECE
 Fiedler Hall - CE
 Rathbone Hall - Main engineering, IMSE, MNE
 Ward Hall - MNE
 Seaton Hall - BAE, ARE/CNS

In addition to these buildings, several off-campus locations house experimentation labs and support facilities.

Student involvement
More than 60 student organizations and competition teams are offered for those seeking to meet other students and apply skills learned in the classroom. Each of the eight college departments sponsor at least one club or organization. These include the Concrete Canoe Team, Steel Bridge Team, SAE Aero Design Team, Helwig Farms Quarter-Scale Tractor Team, Powercat Motorsports, SAE Baja Team and K-State Robotic Competition Team. The American Indian Science and Engineering Society, Engineering Ambassadors, Engineering Student Council, Society of Women Engineers (SWE), National Society of Black Engineers, Society of Hispanic Professional Engineers and Steel Ring Honorary Society represent college-wide organizations.

Research
K-State engineering has numerous research centers, groups, laboratories, institutes and programs, as well as ongoing multidisciplinary efforts within engineering, and among other colleges and universities around the world.

See also
 University of Kansas School of Engineering

References

Kansas State University colleges and schools
Engineering schools and colleges in the United States
Engineering universities and colleges in Kansas
Educational institutions established in 1897
1897 establishments in Kansas